Gregory Vlastos (July 27, 1907 – October 12, 1991) was a preeminent scholar of ancient philosophy, and author of many works on Plato and Socrates. He transformed the analysis of classical philosophy by applying techniques of modern analytic philosophy to restate and evaluate the views of Socrates and Plato.

Life and works
Vlastos was born in Istanbul, to a Scottish mother and a Greek father, where he received a Bachelor of Arts from Robert College before moving to Harvard University where he received a PhD in 1931. After teaching for several years at Queen's University in Kingston, Ontario, Canada, he moved to Cornell University in 1948. He was Stuart Professor of Philosophy at Princeton University between 1955 and 1976, and then Mills Professor of Philosophy at University of California, Berkeley until 1987. He received a MacArthur Foundation Fellowship in 1990. He was twice awarded a Guggenheim Fellowship, was a fellow of the American Academy of Arts and Sciences, a corresponding fellow of the British Academy, and a member of the American Philosophical Society. In 1988 he gave the British Academy's Master-Mind Lecture. Vlastos died in 1991, before finishing a new compilation of essays on Socratic philosophy.

He is credited with bringing about a renaissance of interest in Plato among philosophers throughout the world. Many of Vlastos' students have become important scholars of ancient philosophy, including Terence Irwin, Richard Kraut, Paul Woodruff, and Alexander Nehamas.

Theory of Socratic philosophy
In his work The Philosophy of Socrates: a Collection of Critical Essays (UNDP 1971), Vlastos advanced the idea "that one can identify in certain Platonic dialogues a philosophical method and a collection of philosophical theses which may properly be attributed to Socrates." He suggested a plausible modern analytic framework for Socratic philosophy as a pursuit distinct from Platonic philosophy. The dialogues of Plato’s Socratic period, called "elenctic dialogues" for Socrates’s preferred method of questioning, are Apology, Charmides, Crito, Euthyphro, Gorgias, Hippias Minor, Ion, Laches, Protagoras and book 1 of the Republic.  The idea remains controversial and those who agree with his position are referred to as Vlastosians.

Works
 Christian Faith and Democracy, Association Press, 1939.
 Platonic Studies, Princeton University Press, 1973,  ; 1981 2nd edition, pbk
 Socrates, Ironist and Moral Philosopher, Cornell University Press, 1991,  
 Socratic Studies, Cambridge University Press, 1994,  ; 1995 pbk reprint
 Studies in Greek Philosophy Volume I: the Presocratics, Princeton University Press, 1995,  
 Studies in Greek Philosophy; Volume II: Socrates, Plato, and Their Tradition, Princeton University Press, 1995,  
 Plato's Universe, Parmenides Publishing, 2005,

Edited
 Towards the Christian Revolution - with R.B.Y. Scott, Willett, Clark & Company, 1936.
 Plato, a Collection of Critical Essays: I, Metaphysics and Epistemology; II, Ethics, Politics, and Philosophy of Art and Religion. Anchor Books / Doubleday and Company, 1971
 The Philosophy of Socrates: a Collection of Critical Essays, Anchor, 1971. New ed., (Modern Studies in Philosophy), University of Notre Dame Press, 1980,

See also
 Harold F. Cherniss, for the Cherniss-Vlastos critique of the Tübingen School
 Vlastos

References

External links
 
 Princeton University Department of Philosophy - Gregory Vlastos
 Works of Gregory Vlastos on Philpapers.org
 "Gregory Vlastos, 84, Philosopher Who Analyzed Classical Works"

1907 births
1991 deaths
Greek classical scholars
Turkish emigrants to the United Kingdom
MacArthur Fellows
Turkish people of Greek descent
Robert College alumni
Harvard University alumni
Cornell University faculty
Princeton University faculty
University of California, Berkeley faculty
Scholars of ancient Greek philosophy
Christian philosophers
20th-century American historians
Academics from Istanbul
Canadian Christian socialists
Corresponding Fellows of the British Academy
Members of the American Philosophical Society
Constantinopolitan Greeks